Bringing Out the Dead is a 1999 American psychological drama film directed by Martin Scorsese and written by Paul Schrader, based on the novel of the same name by Joe Connelly. It stars Nicolas Cage, Patricia Arquette, John Goodman, Ving Rhames, and Tom Sizemore. The plot depicts the life of a depressed New York City paramedic (Cage). 

The film was released in the United States on October 22, 1999 by Paramount Pictures in North America, while it was released internationally by Touchstone Pictures through Buena Vista International. It was the final film to be released on LaserDisc in the United States.

Plot 
In Manhattan, paramedic Frank Pierce suffers from depression, insomnia, and occupational burnout having not saved any patients in months after botching the resuscitation of Rose, a homeless teen.  He has begun to hallucinate Rose's ghost. One night, Frank and his partner Larry respond to a dispatcher's (Martin Scorsese) call by the family of Mr. Burke who has entered cardiac arrest. There, Frank befriends Burke's distraught daughter Mary, a former junkie, and discovers Mary was friends with Noel, a drug addict and delinquent who is frequently sent to the hospital.

After a few minor calls, Frank and Larry respond to the aftermath of a shooting, where Frank notices two vials of "Red Death" heroin roll out from a surviving victim's sleeve. While in the back of the ambulance with Frank and Noel, the victim attempts to repent for his drug dealing ways but dies before they can reach the hospital.

The next day, Frank is paired with Marcus, a narcissistic and religious individual, and the two respond to a dispatcher's (Queen Latifah) call, to a man reported to be in cardiac arrest in a club. When they arrive, Frank diagnoses that he is, in fact, suffering from an overdose caused by Red Death. As Frank injects the man with Narcan, Marcus starts a prayer circle with the baffled club-goers, and just as his preaching climaxes, the overdosed man regains consciousness.

On the way back to the hospital, Frank visits Mary's apartment to tell her that her father's condition is improving. Frank and Marcus then respond to a call by a young man whose girlfriend is giving birth to twins. Frank and Marcus rush the two infants and mother to the hospital, where Marcus brings the mother and healthy twin to the maternity ward, while Frank attempts to revive the other twin with the hospital staff. The hospital is unable to revive the smaller twin, and a dismayed Frank starts drinking before Marcus joins him and crashes the ambulance into a parked car.

The following morning, Frank sees Mary leaving the hospital and follows her to an apartment block; Mary tells Frank that she is visiting a friend and he escorts her to the room. After waiting a while, Frank barges in and discovers that it is a drug den run by a dealer named Cy Coates. Mary admits that she has turned back to drugs to cope with her father's condition, and as Frank tries to get her to leave, Cy offers him some pills.

In a moment of desperation, Frank takes the drugs and begins to hallucinate, seeing more ghosts of his patients. Once sober, he grabs Mary and carries her out of the building. While visiting a comatose Burke in the hospital, Frank starts hearing Burke's voice in his head, telling Frank to let him die, but he resuscitates Burke instead.

In his third shift, Frank is paired with Tom Wolls, a fervent and messianic man with violent tendencies. The pair respond to a dispatcher's (Martin Scorsese) call to Cy's drug den where a shooting has occurred, and find Cy impaled on a railing. Frank holds onto Cy as emergency services cut the railing but both are nearly flung off the edge before being pulled back up. Cy then thanks Frank for saving his life and becomes the first patient Frank has saved in months.

Afterward, Frank agrees to help Tom beat up Noel, and chase him down. Frank starts to hallucinate again, snapping out of it just as he comes upon Tom beating Noel with a baseball bat. Frank saves Noel. As Frank visits Burke again, the voice pleads for death once more, and Frank removes Burke's breathing apparatus, causing him to fatally enter cardiac arrest. Frank then heads to Mary's apartment to inform her that he died. He hallucinates Rose's ghost for a final time, obtaining her forgiveness.  Mary accepts her father's death. Frank is invited in and falls asleep with Mary.

Cast 

 Nicolas Cage as Frank Pierce
 Patricia Arquette as Mary Burke
 John Goodman as Larry
 Ving Rhames as Marcus
 Tom Sizemore as Tom Wolls
 Marc Anthony as Noel
 Cliff Curtis as Cy Coates
 Nestor Serrano as Doctor Hazmat
 Afemo Omilami as Griss
 Mary Beth Hurt as Nurse Constance
 Aida Turturro as Nurse Crupp
 Phyllis Somerville as Mrs. Burke
 Sonja Sohn as Kanita
 Michael K. Williams as a Drug Dealer
 Martin Scorsese as the voice of Male Dispatcher
 Queen Latifah as the voice of Dispatcher Love
 Judy Reyes as an ICU nurse

Soundtrack
 TB Sheets - Van Morrison
 The September of My Years - Frank Sinatra
 You Can't Put Your Arms Around A Memory - Johnny Thunders
 Bell Boy - The Who
 Mr. Highway - Elmer Bernstein
 Threat - Elmer Bernstein
 Llegaste a Mi - Marc Anthony
 What's The Frequency, Kenneth? - R.E.M.
 Too Many Fish In The Sea - The Marvelettes
 Don't You Worry 'Bout a Thing - Stevie Wonder
 So What! - Jane's Addiction
 Nowhere To Run - Martha & The Vandellas
 These Are Days - 10,000 Maniacs
 I and I Survive (Slavery Days) - Burning Spear
 Rivers Of Babylon - The Melodians
 Le Sacre du Pintemps (The Rite of Spring) - New York Philharmonic
 Rang Tang Ding Dong (I Am A Japanese Sandman) - The Cellos
 Combination of the Two - Big Brother & The Holding Company
 Hasta Ayer - Marc Anthony
 Janie Jones - The Clash
 Red Red Wine - UB40
 I'm So Bored with the U.S.A. - The Clash

Reception

Critical response 
On Rotten Tomatoes, Bringing Out the Dead has an approval rating of 73% based on 111 reviews, with an average rating of 6.70/10. The site's consensus reads, "Stunning and compelling, Scorsese and Cage succeed at satisfying the audience." On Metacritic, the film has an average score of 70 out of 100, based on reviews from 34 critics. Audiences surveyed by CinemaScore gave the film a grade "C−" on scale of A to F.

Roger Ebert gave it a perfect four-star rating, writing, "To look at Bringing Out the Dead—to look, indeed, at almost any Scorsese film—is to be reminded that film can touch us urgently and deeply."

Years later, Scorsese reflected to Ebert that Bringing Out the Dead "failed at the box office, and was rejected by a lot of the critics." Yet he added: "I had 10 years of ambulances. My parents, in and out of hospitals. Calls in the middle of the night. I was exorcising all of that. Those city paramedics are heroes -- and saints, they're saints. I grew up next to the Bowery, watching the people who worked there, the Salvation Army, Dorothy Day's Catholic Worker Movement, all helping the lost souls. They're the same sort of people."

Thelma Schoonmaker, the editor, praised the movie and said: "It's the only one of [Scorsese's] films, I think, that hasn't gotten its due. It's a beautiful film, but it was hard for people to take, I think. Unexpected. But I think it's great." She claims that the film initially was mis-marketed as a car-chase film: "What happened was, that film was about compassion, and it was sold, I think, as a car chase movie. When I saw the trailer I said, "Wait a minute! That's not what the movie's about!" I think people were made nervous by the theme of it, which I think is beautiful. I think it'll get its due." 

In 2021, Nicolas Cage singled out Bringing Out the Dead as one of the best movies he ever made.

Box office 
Bringing Out the Dead debuted at #4 in 1,936 theatres with a weekend gross of $6,193,052. The film grossed $16.7 million against a production budget of $32 million, making it a box office bomb.

See also 
 Opioid epidemic

References

External links 

 
 

1999 films
1999 drama films
1999 horror films
1990s American films
1990s English-language films
1990s supernatural films
American drama films
American supernatural horror films
Films based on American novels
Films directed by Martin Scorsese
Films produced by Scott Rudin
Films scored by Elmer Bernstein
Films set in New York City
Films shot in New York City
Films with screenplays by Paul Schrader
Paramount Pictures films
Touchstone Pictures films
Films distributed by Disney